Sioeli Lama (born 12 October 1995) is a Tongan born Romanian rugby union player who plays as a Scrumhalf for CEC Bank SuperLiga club CSM București.

References

External links

1995 births
Living people
Tongan emigrants to Romania
Tongan rugby union players
Romanian rugby union players
Rugby union scrum-halves
CSM București (rugby union) players
CSA Steaua București (rugby union) players